Eucalyptus cameronii, commonly known as the diehard stringybark is a flowering plant that is endemic to eastern Australia. It is a small to medium-sized tree with rough, stringy bark from the trunk to the small branches, lance-shaped to curved adult leaves, flowers buds in groups of between nine and fifteen, white flowers and cup-shaped, hemispherical or more or less spherical fruit. It mainly grows on the eastern side of the Northern Tablelands in New South Wales.

Description
The bark is rough, stringy, grey to brownish and extends to the smaller branches. Flowering has been observed in March and the flowers are white.

This eucalypt is similar to E. globoidea but has smaller buds and fruit, and the fruit has a narrower disc. It is also similar to E. caliginosa which has the valves of the fruit extended beyond the rim.

Taxonomy and naming
Eucalyptus cameronii was first formally described in 1934 by the William Blakely and Ernest McKie in Blakely's book A Key to the Eucalypts. The type specimen was collected in the Diehard State Forest near Glen Innes. The specific epithet (cameronii) honours Archibald Peter Cameron, one of the collectors of the type specimen.

Distribution and habitat
Diehard stringybark grows in forest on the ranges and escarpments on the eastern side of the Northern Tablelands from just north of the Queensland border as far south as the Cottan-Bimbang National Park. It mostly grows on poor, shallow soils.

References

cameronii
Myrtales of Australia
Flora of New South Wales
Flora of Queensland
Trees of Australia
Plants described in 1934